NBH may refer to:

A C0 and C1 control code
New Broadcasting House, the 2011 extension to the BBC Headquarters